Verkhnodniprovsk Raion was a raion (district) of Dnipropetrovsk Oblast, southeastern-central Ukraine. Its administrative centre was located at Verkhnodniprovsk. The raion was abolished on 18 July 2020 as part of the administrative reform of Ukraine, which reduced the number of raions of Dnipropetrovsk Oblast to seven. The area of Verkhnodniprovsk Raion was merged into Kamianske Raion.

At the time of disestablishment, the raion consisted of two hromadas:
 Verkhivtseve urban hromada with the administration in the city of Verkhivtseve;
 Verkhnodniprovsk urban hromada with the administration in Verkhnodniprovsk.

References

Former raions of Dnipropetrovsk Oblast
1923 establishments in Ukraine
Ukrainian raions abolished during the 2020 administrative reform